South Dakota Women's Prison is located in Pierre, South Dakota, U.S., and is part of the Solem Public Safety Center.

References

Prisons in South Dakota
Women's prisons in the United States
Women in South Dakota
Buildings and structures in Pierre, South Dakota